Otto Voelckers (also spelled Otto Völckers) (November 9, 1888 in Kassel - December 6, 1957) was a German architect and technical author.

Biography

Voelckers was initially an active art director in the 1920s. However, at the end of this decade he became famous in Germany for his work with the Finnish architect Alvar Aalto. Until 1933 Voelsckers was the editor of the magazine Stein Holz Eisen (Rock, wood, ice).

After the end of World War II he became very engaged with the reconstruction of Munich and was one of the few architects, that would link his ideas to the Neues Bauen movement, a radical new form proposed for the old city. Voelckers's reconstruction plan envisioned closed buildings composed of large blocks which were in cooperative ownership, which would have glassed-covered passages and retail areas to encourage use as social centers. Even in the planned reconstruction of the Goethe House, Voelckers pleaded for a full redesign, but was not able to successfully promote his idea over the faithful reconstruction proposed by Theo Kellner.

Voelckers was also known for his design of Notstands-Kleinstwohnungen, that was commissioned by the Münchener Wiederaufbau-Referat (Munich Reconstruction Referendum) of 1945–1946. These small apartments were allowed by the zoning commission to have a maximum space of 4 m2 per Person, with this restraint, Voelckers attempted to „Bestmögliche an Brauchbarkeit, Wohnlichkeit und Schönheit herauszuholen“ (Extract the most usability, livability and beauty from the space).

From 1950 until his death, he was the associate editor of the architectural magazine Glasforum. Voelckers was also member of the Deutscher Werkbund.

Works

Papers 
 Die neue Volksschule in Celle - Ein Beitrag zum Problem des neuzeitlichen Schulhauses. Verlag Englert & Schlosser, Frankfurt a/Main 1929 
 Wohnbaufibel. Für Anfänger und solche, die glauben es nicht mehr zu sein. Julius Hoffmann Verlag, Stuttgart 1932
 Deutsche Hausfibel. Staackmann, Leipzig 1937
 Glas und Fenster. Ihr Wesen, ihre Geschichte und Bedeutung in der Gegenwart. Bauwelt Verlag, Berlin 1939
 Dorf und Stadt. Eine deutsche Fibel. Staackmann, Leipzig 1942
 Bauen mit Glas. Julius Hoffmann Verlag, Stuttgart 1948
 Das Grundrißwerk. Julius Hoffmann Verlag, Stuttgart 1949 (3. Auflage)
 Wohnraum und Hausrat. Eine Fibel. Baessler, Bamberg 1949
 So wohnen die Völker der Erde. Cassineum, Donauwörth 1949

Buildings and Designs 
 1914: Entwurf Haus Kammersänger K. in München
 vor 1915: Haus Dr. Drevermann in Frankfurt-Eschersheim, Häberlinstraße / Keßlerstraße (verändert)
 vor 1915: Entwurf zu einem Haus und Garten am Schloßberg in Marburg
 1923: Entwurf der Kulissen zu dem zweiteiligen Monumentalfilm Helena
 1925: Entwurf für ein großes Reihenhaus in dunkelroter Farbgebung für München
 vor 1926: Haus Auf der Kupferschmiede
 1928: Kleinwohnung auf der Münchener Ausstellung „Heim und Technik“

Filmography
 1924: Helena
 1926: Das deutsche Mutterherz

External links

References

Architects from Munich
German production designers
1888 births
1957 deaths
Architects from Kassel
Film people from Hesse